TA3 can be:

 Slovak private TV news channel, see TA3 (news channel)
 Former Slovak TV channel, see TA3 (1991-1992)
 Miniature XLR connector, for microphones
 Cambodian private airline opened in September 1991.